Jim G. Bundren (born October 6, 1974) is a former American football offensive guard who played two seasons with the Cleveland Browns of the National Football League (NFL). He was drafted by the Miami Dolphins in the seventh round of the 1998 NFL Draft. Bundren played college football at Clemson University and attended Alexis I. duPont High School in Greenville, Delaware. He also attended Valley Forge Military Academy and College in Wayne, Pennsylvania. He was also a member of the New York Jets and Miami Dolphins.

Early years
Bundren earned first-team All-State honors and was a two-way starter in the Delaware Blue-Gold All-Star game for Alexis I. duPont High School. He was inducted into the Delaware Sports Hall of Fame in 2007. He also played one year at Valley Forge Military Academy and College.

College career
Bundren was a four-year starter at left tackle for the Clemson Tigers football team from 1994 to 1997. He started 47 games in his college career and earned All-Atlantic Coast Conference honors. He was also chosen second-team All-American by Football News and third-team All-American by the Associated Press and Sporting News his senior year. Bundren was named first-team academic All-ACC in 1996 and 1997.

Professional career
Bundren was drafted by the Miami Dolphins with the 210th pick in the 1998 NFL Draft. He was released by the Dolphins on August 31, 2014. He was claimed off waivers by the New York Jets on August 31, 1998. Bundren spent the 1999 and 2000 NFL seasons playing for the Cleveland Browns. He was released by the Browns on August 29, 2001. He signed with the Miami Dolphins on January 17, 2002. Bundren was waived/injured by the Dolphins on August 6, 2002. He was released on February 26, 2003.

References

External links
Just Sports Stats

Living people
1974 births
American football offensive guards
Clemson Tigers football players
Miami Dolphins players
New York Jets players
Cleveland Browns players
Players of American football from Michigan
Sportspeople from Pontiac, Michigan
Valley Forge Military Academy Trojans football players